Border Street (Polish:Ulica Graniczna) is a 1948 Polish drama film directed by Aleksander Ford and starring Mieczysława Ćwiklińska, Jerzy Leszczyński, Jerzy Złotnicki and Władysław Godik. The film depicts the Nazis' purge of Warsaw Jews  by following the fates of five families, representative of the various social, political, and ethnic strata in Warsaw, through the war, and culminates in the Warsaw Ghetto Uprising. Ford did not provide viewers a happy ending because he wanted "the viewer who watches it to realize that the issue of fascism and racial oppression is not over." It won the Gran Prix at the 1948 Venice Film Festival.
The film's sets were designed by the art director Stepán Kopecký.

Plot 
In Poland in the summer of 1939 there was the deepest peace. The place of action is initially an ordinary Warsaw apartment building. The tenants are of different nature and social background. There is, for example, the enterprising Bronek, then young Władek, son of a Polish officer with great reservations and prejudices against Jews, then Fredek, the devious son of the pub owner Kusmirek, the small Jewish boy David Libermann with grandfather, and young Hedwig, whose Father the wealthy doctor Dr. Bialek is. There are the normal quarrels, little pranks and the usual house gossip. The peace comes to an abrupt end when the German Wehrmacht invades the Polish capital. Suddenly everything changes overnight, the Polish residents are harassed, their Jewish fellow citizens are persecuted and arrested. Some of them want to somehow come to terms with the new rulers and circumstances, others clench their fists in their pockets and others have to go into hiding as soon as they are wanted. 

The old Jew Libermann, himself highly endangered, hides the Jew-hater and officer Kazimierz Wojtan, Wladek's father, who has hitherto been bold and haughty. When this is discovered, the soldier is shot. The Libermanns are forced to leave their home and move to the Warsaw ghetto, which was specially set up for the Jewish population. Bronek tries to help them there as best he can. Kusmirek tries to make friends with the "new gentlemen" and curry favor with them at every opportunity. He even puts his own son in the garb of a Hitler Youth. When the characterless bartender at Dr. Białek discovered Jewish roots, he immediately denounced him to the Gestapo. He promises to be able to take over his apartment. In fact, the doctor is picked up and deported to the ghetto, where he eventually perishes. Finally, in 1943, there was an uprising against the German occupiers.  David and Hedwig take the opportunity to flee from the Germans through the sewers. Bronek and Władek help them in a crucial way. But David wants to go back to the ghetto, to fight the Nazis side by side with his brothers, gun in hand. For this fight, Władek presented him with the gun of his anti-Semitic father, who had been shot.

Cast
 Mieczysława Ćwiklińska as Mrs. Klara  
 Jerzy Leszczyński as Dr. Józef Bialek  
 Władysław Godik as Grandfather Libermann  
 Władysław Walter as Cieplikowski  
 Jerzy Pichelski as Kazimierz Wojtan  
 Tadeusz Fijewski as Bronek Cieplikowski / Kusmirak's hair stylist  
 Józef Munclinger as Kusmirak  
 Robert Vrchota as Hans, Gestapo Officer  
 Stefan Sródka  as Natan Sziuliu  
 Eugeniusz Kruk as Fredek Kusmirak 
 Jerzy Zlotnicki as David Libermann 
 Dionizy Ilczenko as Wladek Wojtan 
 Maria Broniewska as Jadzia Bialkówna  
 Justyna Kreczmar as Wanda Kusmirakówna 
 Maria Zabczynska as Wojtanowa  
 Irena Renardówna as Jewish Woman 
 Janina Lukowska as Estera Libermann  
 Halina Raciecka as Jewish Woman  
 Gustav Nezval 
 Antonín Holzinger
 Karel Hradilák  
 Jaroslav Orlický 
 P. Marek 
 N. Zarina 
 Bronisław Darski as Janitor Walenty  
 Edward Dziewoński as Feldfebel  
 S. Borowski 
 Karol Koszela
 Stanissław Bielinski as Geandarm  
 Ida Kamińska as Helena  
 Maria Kedzierska as Woman  
 Wincenty Loskot as Man  
 Wojciech Pilarski as Fire guard  
 Helena Puchniewska as Piszczykowa

References

Bibliography
 Ewa Mazierska & Michael Goddard. Polish Cinema in a Transnational Context. Boydell & Brewer, 2014.

External links
 

1948 films
1948 drama films
1940s Polish-language films
Polish drama films
Films directed by Aleksander Ford
Polish black-and-white films
Films about Polish resistance during World War II
Films about Jewish resistance during the Holocaust